Wahl is an unincorporated community in Escambia County, Alabama, United States.

Notes

Unincorporated communities in Escambia County, Alabama
Unincorporated communities in Alabama